Marte Gerhardsen (born 21 July 1972) is a Norwegian civil servant, politician and organizational leader. She is a daughter of Rune Gerhardsen and Tove Strand.

From 2008 she was secretary general of the Norwegian chapter of the relief agency CARE. From April 2014 she headed the think-tank Agenda.

References

1972 births
Living people
Norwegian civil servants
Politicians from Oslo
Labour Party (Norway) politicians
21st-century Norwegian women politicians
21st-century Norwegian politicians